Waleed Al-Rajaa is a Saudi Arabian football left-back who played .

External links

1981 births
Living people
Saudi Arabian footballers
Ettifaq FC players
Al-Nahda Club (Saudi Arabia) players
Khaleej FC players
Hajer FC players
Al-Taawoun FC players
Al-Sahel SC (Saudi Arabia) players
Saudi First Division League players
Saudi Professional League players
Saudi Fourth Division players
Association football midfielders